Craig Bianchi (born 25 March 1978 in Cape Town, Western Cape) is a South African football (soccer) defender who played for Hellenic. He made 7 appearances for South Africa national team.

Bianchi hails from Elsie's River on the Cape Flats. He made his senior debut as a 16-year-old in 1994.

External links

1978 births
Living people
Association football defenders
Mamelodi Sundowns F.C. players
Maritzburg United F.C. players
Sportspeople from Cape Town
South African soccer players
White South African people
Santos F.C. (South Africa) players
South African people of Italian descent
Hellenic F.C. players
2005 CONCACAF Gold Cup players
South Africa international soccer players